Nova Europa (Portuguese for "New Europe") is a municipality in the state of São Paulo in Brazil.

References

Municipalities in São Paulo (state)